Christin Carmichael Greb is a Canadian realtor and former politician who represented Ward 16 Eglinton—Lawrence on Toronto City Council from 2014 to 2018.

Background 
She is the daughter of former Don Valley West Member of Parliament John Carmichael. Prior to entering politics, she was a business analyst at Bombardier Aerospace.

Political career 
Carmichael Greb was elected following the 2014 municipal election.

In 2018, she introduced a motion to life the city's ban on street hockey, following residents' complaints of by-law notices about hockey and basketball nets blocking roads and an open letter to the city from Ontario Minister of Children and Youth Services Michael Coteau. The motion passed 35–2 .

Carmichael Greb ran for Toronto City Council again in 2018, but finished second behind Michael Colle.

Municipal electoral record

References

External links
Official Campaign Site

Living people
Toronto city councillors
Women in Ontario politics
Toronto Metropolitan University alumni
University of Western Ontario alumni
Women municipal councillors in Canada
Year of birth missing (living people)